The Morrison Formation is a distinctive sequence of Late Jurassic sedimentary rock that is found in the western United States, which has a wide assortment of taxa represented in its fossil record, including dinosaur fossils in North America. It is composed of mudstone, sandstone, siltstone and limestone and is light grey, greenish gray, or red. Most of the fossils occur in the green siltstone beds and lower sandstones, relics of the rivers and floodplains of the Jurassic period.

(mostly from Foster [2003]; the higher-level classifications will vary as new finds are made.

Plants

Gnetales

Invertebrates

Arthropods

Vertebrates

Fish 
Although the paleoclimate of the Morrison formation was semiarid with only seasonal rainfall, there were enough bodies of water to support a diverse ichthyofauna. Although abundant, fish remains are constrained to only certain locations within the formation. Microvertebrate sites in Wyoming are dominated by fish remains. Indeterminate ray-finned fish remains have been recovered from Ninemile Hill and a microvertebrate site in the Black Hills. Found in stratigraphic zones 2, 4, and 5. Morrison actinopterygians generally have no close modern relatives. The Wyoming microvertebrate remains are extracted from the sediment by screenwashing. Paleoniscoid remains are geographically present in the western part of Colorado, where remains have been recovered from "a level above the Mygatt-Moore Quarry." Largely complete remains of small individuals have been consistently recovered for over 15 years. So far, Morrison pycnodontoids are represented by a single specimen from Dinosaur National Monument in Utah. Found in stratigraphic zone 4. Only a single specimen from Dinosaur National Monument in Utah has been recovered. Pycnodontoids were "deep-bodied and laterally compressed fish" whose tooth morphology suggest that they preyed on small contemporary invertebrates. They may have resembled modern butterfly fish. A single tooth is the only known remains. Dipnoan remains found at a fossil site not far from Cañon City, Colorado. Remains usually in a state of rather complete preservation. Halecostome remains are geographically present in the western part of Colorado, where remains have been recovered from "a level above the Mygatt-Moore Quarry." Largely complete remains of small individuals have been consistently recovered for over 15 years. Amiid remains found in stratigraphic zones 2, 3, and 4. Found at a fossil site not far from Cañon City, Colorado. Remains usually in a state of rather complete preservation.

{| class="wikitable" align="center" width="100%"
|- 
! Name
! Species
! Locality
! Material
! Notes
! Images
|-
| rowspan=5 | 
Ceratodus
| 
C. fossanovum
|
|
| rowspan=4 |
A lungfish genus whose members ranged from 1 to 2 m in length and weights of up to 79 pounds, with most Morrison lungfish being on the smaller end of that range. These species are believed to have had similar diets to extant lungfish like the physically similar modern genus Neoceratodus.
| rowspan=10 |

|-
| 
C. ?frazieri
|
|
|-
|style="background:#fbdddb;" | 
C. guentheri
|style="background:#fbdddb;" |
|style="background:#fbdddb;" |
|-
| 
C. robustus
|
|
|-
| 
Indeterminate.
|
Brushy Basin and Saltwash members
|
|
Represented by tooth plates.
|-
| 
Hulettia
| 
H. hawesi
|
Colorado
|
|
A small fish of the division Halecostomi about 7.6 cm in length and 5g of live mass which probably preferred quiet water. Its fossils prominently preserve its thick interlocking scales.
|-
| 
cf. Leptolepis
| 
N/A
|
Colorado
|
Known only from a single nearly complete skeleton found at Rabbit Valley. Found in stratigraphic zone 5.
|
A 13 cm (5 inch) fish that was deeper bodied than its co-occurring contemporaries Morrolepis and Hulettia. The Morrison cf. Leptolepis probably had a live mass of about 37g. It is the only teleost fish known from the formation and was morphologically more highly derived than other Morrison fish. It is believed to have fed on contemporary fish and small invertebrates.
|-
| 
Morrolepis
| 
M. schaefferi<ref name="foster-morrolepis">Foster, J. (2007). "Morrolepis schaefferi." pp. 131-132.</ref>
|
Colorado
|
|
A coccolepidid "palaeoniscoid" with forward-set eyes positioned past the front end of the lower jaw. It had a tall dorsal fin set far back on the body and an asymmetrical caudal fin. Adult specimens would reach about 20 cm in length and 113 g (4 oz) in mass.
|-
| Potamoceratodus| P. guentheri|
Colorado
|
|
Once thought to be a species of Ceratodus.
|-
|}

 Amphibians 

Frogs are known from several sites in the Morrison Formation, but are not particularly well represented. The history of Morrison anuran discoveries began with the recovery of remains from Quarry 9 near Como Bluff, Wyoming. The new genus Eobatrachus was erected for some of these remains by O. C. Marsh, but the material was later considered non-diagnostic. Decades later another dubious anuran genus, Comobatrachus, was erected based on additional fragmentary remains. Despite the erection of multiple new names, only  two frog species are currently recognised from the Morrison: Enneabatrachus hechti and Rhadinosteus parvus.In addition to formally named taxa, indeterminate anuran remains have been recovered from Morrison strata in Colorado, Wyoming, and Utah, with the best specimens found in Dinosaur National Monument and Quarry 9. Stratigraphically speaking, indeterminate anurans have been found in stratigraphic zones 2 and 4. Indeterminate anurans with remains diagnostic down to the family level have also been reported from the Morrison, with pelobatids being represented by the ilium of an unnamed and indeterminate species, which was recovered from Quarry 9. Pelobatids are present in stratigraphic zones 5 and 6.

Indeterminate salamander remains are present in stratigraphic zones 2, 4, and 5. A distinctive type of salamander known only as Caudata B is present in stratigraphic zone 6.

 Sphenodonts 

Squamates
Numerous squamate remains have been found in the sediments of the Morrison Formation, most commonly at sites in Utah, Colorado and Wyoming. A number of taxa have been described, coming from three different groups: anguimorph and scincomorph lizards and early snakes. The first squamates to be reported from the Morrison Formation were Paramacellodus and Dorsetisaurus, which were described from Wyoming's Quarry 9 by Don Prothero and Richard Estes. Later remains would include Diablophis, originally described as a species of Parviraptor by Susan Evans in 1996 but subsequently moved to the new genus Diablophis by Michael Caldwell et al. in 2015, with extra material also being reported from Utah's Cisco Mammal Quarry, and Schillerosaurus, originally described as "Schilleria" and reported from Dinosaur National Monument by Evans and Dan Chure in 1999. Two later additions to the Morrison's squamate assemblages are Eoscincus and Microteras, two scincomorph lizards found at Dinosaur National Monument and Como Bluff's Quarry 9, respectively. They were described by Chase Brownstein et al. in 2022. Indeterminate squamate remains have currently been described from Dinosaur National Monument.

The majority of modern-day scincomorph lizards are small insectivores that feed on a range of invertebrates. It is thought that their counterparts from the Morrison Formation would have occupied a similar niche due to their morphological similarities. Anguimorph lizards most likely hunted small vertebrates, and Diablophis is thought to have done so too. Prey items would have included the other squamates from the formation as well as its large diversity of small mammals. All squamates might have been prey for the larger predators of the Morrison Formation, including the abundant theropod dinosaurs and crocodilians. 

 Turtles 
Turtles (Testudines) are very common fossils in the Morrison, due to their bony shells.
The most common were Glyptops plicatus (very common) and Dinochelys whitei (also common, but not as common as Glyptops). Also present were Dorsetochelys buzzops and Uluops uluops.

 Choristoderes 

 Crurotarsans 
Crocodiles of a variety of sizes and habitats were common Morrison animals. Cursorial mesosuchians, or small terrestrial running crocs, included Hallopus victor and Fruitachampsa callisoni. More derived crocodilians included Diplosaurus ferox, Amphicotylus, Hoplosuchus kayi, and Macelognathus vagans.

 Pterosaurs 
Pterosaurs are very uncommon fossils in the Morrison, because the fragility of their thin walled bones often prevented their remains from being preserved. Despite being uncommon they are geographically widespread; indeterminate pterosaur remains have been found in stratigraphic zones 2 and 4-6. In addition to indeterminate remains, several species have been identified from both the rhamphorhynchoids (long-tailed pterosaurs) and pterodactyloids (short-tailed pterosaurs). Since the 1970s and 80s, pterosaur finds have become more common, but are still rare. Most Morrison pterosaurs have been found in marine and shoreline deposits. Pterosaur tracks have been found in both the Tidwell and Saltwash members. Morrison pterosaurs probably lived on fish, insects and scavenged dinosaur carcasses, or even foraged for prey, and actively hunted; they are fairly ecologically diverse, ranging from small hawking insectivore Mesadactylus to the raptorial Harpactognathus. While relatively few pterosaur genera are named from the Morrison Formation, fragmentary material that is not referrable to the genus level suggests the presence of dsungaripteroids, ctenochasmatids, dimorphodontids, and more tentatively wukongopterids and pteranodontians.Stephen Czerkas; Tracy Ford (2018). "Pterosaur or diapsid? The search for the true Utahdactylus". Flugsaurier 2018: The 6th International Symposium on Pterosaurs. Los Angeles, USA. Abstracts: 35–36.

{| class="wikitable" align="center" width="100%"
|- 
! Name
! Species
! Locality
! Material
! Notes
! Images
|-
|style="background:#E6E6E6;"| Comodactylus|style="background:#E6E6E6;"| C. ostromi|style="background:#E6E6E6;"| 
Wyoming, Brushy Basin member
|style="background:#E6E6E6;"|
A metacarpal.
|style="background:#E6E6E6;"| Nomen dubium| rowspan="8" |
|-
|style="background:#E6E6E6;"| Dermodactylus|style="background:#E6E6E6;"|  D. montanus|style="background:#E6E6E6;"| 
Wyoming, Brushy Basin member
|style="background:#E6E6E6;"|
A wing phalanx. 
|style="background:#E6E6E6;"| Nomen dubium|-
| Harpactognathus| H. gentryii|
Wyoming, Brushy Basin member
|
A partial snout. 
|
A large rhamphorhynchid with a wingspan of about 2.5 m and live mass of about 1.5 kg (3.3 lbs). Harpactognathus was related to the Solnhofen genus Scaphognathus.
|-
| Kepodactylus| K. insperatus|
Colorado, Brushy Basin member
|
A partial postcranial skeleton. 
|
A large pterodactyloid with a 2.5 m (8 foot) wingspan and a live weight of about 1.5 kg (3 lbs). Kepodactylus may be related to the Asian dsungaripteroid pterosaurs.
|-
|style="background:#E6E6E6;"| Laopteryx|style="background:#E6E6E6;"| L. priscus|style="background:#E6E6E6;"| 
Wyoming, Brushy Basin member
|style="background:#E6E6E6;"|
A braincase. 
|style="background:#E6E6E6;"| Nomen dubium initially misidentified as a bird.
|-
| Mesadactylus| M. ornithosphyos|
Colorado, Brushy Basin member
|A synsacrum.
|Several specimens have been incorrectly referred to Mesadactylus.
|-
|style="background:#FEF6E4;"| Pteraichnus|style="background:#FEF6E4;"| P. saltwashensis''''*
|style="background:#FEF6E4;"| 
Arizona and Oklahoma, Saltwash member
|style="background:#FEF6E4;"| 
|style="background:#FEF6E4;"| 
|-
|style="background:#E6E6E6;"| Utahdactylus|style="background:#E6E6E6;"|  U. kateae|style="background:#E6E6E6;"| 
Utah, Tidwell member
|style="background:#E6E6E6;"|
A fragmentary skeleton. 
|style="background:#E6E6E6;"|
Previously thought to be an indeterminite diapsid, newer material suggests an affinity with ctenochasmatids.
|-
|}

 Dinosaurs 

 Mammaliaforms 
Many types of mammaliaform cynodonts, mostly early mammals, are known from the Morrison; almost all of them were small sized animals, though occupying a very large variety of ecological niches, from the more rodent-like multituberculates to the carnivorous eutriconodonts (including the possibly volant Triconolestes) to the anteater-like Fruitafossor. Unclassified types include the digger Fruitafossor windscheffelia. Docodonts included the common genus Docodon, represented by D. victor, D. striatus, and D. superbus, and Peraiocynodon sp. Multituberculates, a common type of early mammal, were represented by Ctenacodon serratus, C. laticeps, C. scindens, Glirodon grandis, Morrisonodon brentbaatar, Psalodon fortis, ?P. marshi, P. potens, and Zofiabaatar pulcher. Triconodonts present included Amphidon superstes, Aploconodon comoensis, Conodon gidleyi, Priacodon ferox, P. fruitaensis, P. gradaevus, P. lulli, P. robustus, Triconolestes curvicuspis, and Trioracodon bisulcus.

Tinodontids were represented by Eurylambia aequicrurius (probably Tinodon), and Tinodon bellus (including T. lepidus). Finally, two families of Dryolestoidea were present: Paurodontidae, including Comotherium richi, Euthlastus cordiformis, Paurodon valens, and Tathiodon agilis; and Dryolestidae, including Amblotherium gracilis, Dryolestes obtusus (common genus), D. priscus, D. vorax, Laolestes eminens, L. grandis, and Miccylotyrans minimus.

In 2009, a study by J. R. Foster was published which estimated the body masses of mammals from the Morrison Formation by using the ratio of dentary length to body mass of modern marsupials as a reference. Foster concludes that Docodon was the most massive mammaliaform genus of the formation at 141g and Fruitafossor was the least massive at 6g. The average Morrison mammal had a mass of 48.5g. A graph of the body mass distribution of Morrison mammal genera produced a right-skewed curve, meaning that there were more low-mass genera.

 Tinodontids 

 Eutriconodonts 

 Multituberculates 

 Others 

 Dryolestoids 

See also

 List of dinosaur-bearing rock formations
 Pycnodontoidea
 Molluscs
 Synthesis
 lacustrine carbonates

Footnotes

 Bibliography 

 Foster, J. (2007). Jurassic West: The Dinosaurs of the Morrison Formation and Their World. Indiana University Press. 389pp. 
 Lockley, M.; Harris, J.D.; and Mitchell, L. 2008. "A global overview of pterosaur ichnology: tracksite distribution in space and time." Zitteliana''. B28. p. 187-198. 

 01
.
.
Morrison Paleobiota
L
Morrison Formation
L
L
L
L
Morrison Formation
Morrison Paleobiota
Morrison Paleobiota
Morrison Paleobiota